Arja may refer to:

Arja (drama), Balinese dance-opera
Árja, Norwegian Sami political party
Polyura arja, butterfly found in India and Southeast Asia
Arja (given name), Finnish given name